EXPO mimio is a brand name of computer whiteboard capture devices marketed by Sanford Brands.  EXPO mimio devices allow users to digitally capture whiteboard images and text.

The devices link physical whiteboard to software created whiteboards such as in netmeeting, and can also be used to control desktop applications and documents directly from a whiteboard when used with a projector and computer.

On October 4, 2006 Newell Rubbermaid acquired the mimio interactive whiteboard (iWB) product line. The mimio line has become part of the Sanford Brands portfolio of products.

Models
In production:
EXPO mimio Interactive
EXPO mimio Xi
EXPO mimio Board
EXPO mimio wireless
EXPO mimio studio (win)
EXPO mimio Mac
EXPO mimio writingRecognition (win)
EXPO mimio screenRecorder (win)

Computer peripherals